William Leonard Langer (March 16, 1896 – December 26, 1977) was an American historian, intelligence analyst and policy advisor. 
He served as chairman of the history department at Harvard University. He was on leave during World War II as head of the Research and Analysis Branch of the Office of Strategic Services. He was a specialist on the diplomacy of the periods 1840–1900 and World War II. He edited many books, including a series on European history, a large-scale reference book, and a university textbook.

Early life
Born in South Boston, Massachusetts, he was the second of three sons of recent German immigrants, Charles Rudolph and Johanna Rockenbach. His elder brother, Rudolf Ernest Langer, became a mathematician and his younger brother, Walter Charles Langer, a psychoanalyst.

When William was only three, his father died unexpectedly, leaving the family in difficult circumstances. Nevertheless, his mother, who supported the family by working as a dressmaker, made education a priority for her children.

Education and career
After studying at the Boston Latin School, Langer attended Harvard University.

Langer was fluent in German, and taught German at Worcester Academy while furthering his own education with courses on international relations at Clark University.

His job and education were interrupted by military service World War I. After the war, he returned to his studies and obtained his Ph.D. in 1923. In 1921 he married Susanne Katherina Langer (née Knauth) who became a noted philosopher.  They had two sons together before divorcing in 1942.

He taught modern European history at Clark University for four years before accepting an assistant professorship at Harvard. In 1936 Langer became the first to hold the Archibald Coolidge chair.

Langer was remembered at Harvard especially for his History 132 course on modern European history, History 157 on the Ottoman Empire, and the graduate seminars held at his home. He also taught at the Harvard Extension School.

With the help of other scholars during the 1930s, Langer completely revised the Epitome of History by German Scholar Karl Ploetz. Langer's massive work was published in 1940 under the title An Encyclopedia of World History. Its fifth edition (1972) is the last to be edited by Langer. Peter N. Stearns and thirty other prominent historians edited the sixth edition, published in 2001. Stearns paid tribute to Langer's great achievement in the introduction to the new edition.

Later career
In 1957, Langer urged historians to expand their insights with techniques from modern psychology.

War service
Langer was an enlisted man in the United States Army Chemical Service in World War I, and saw combat in a chemical weapons unit on the Western Front in France. He described the experience in a book he wrote with another man in his company.

During World War II, Langer served in the new Office of Strategic Services (OSS) as deputy chief and later chief of the Research and Analysis Branch until the end of the war.  In correspondence he was identified as OSS 117, a codename which entered French popular culture in 1949 for an unrelated iconic fictional character of books and film. He was special assistant for intelligence analysis to U.S. Secretary of State James F. Byrnes. In 1950 Langer organized the office of National Estimates in the newly established Central Intelligence Agency.

After  war 
After the war, Langer returned to academia, but from 1961 to 1977 he served on the President's Foreign Intelligence Advisory Board.

Honors
William Langer was awarded the Medal for Merit by President Truman in July 1946 in recognition of his wartime service. He was also awarded the Bancroft Prize in 1954. Postwar, both Harvard and Yale University awarded Langer LL.D. degrees as did the University of Hamburg in 1955. Among his many involvements, Langer served as president of the American Historical Association for 1957. Langer received the Golden Plate Award of the American Academy of Achievement in 1965.

Selected bibliography
  revised as: Gas and Flame in World War I (1965) online
 An Encyclopedia of World History: Ancient, Medieval, and Modern, Chronologically Arranged. © 1972, 1968, 1952, 1948, & 1940. 1948 edition online
 The Franco-Russian Alliance 1890–1894  (1929) online
 European Alliances and Alignments 1871–1890  (1931) (second edition with supplementary bibliographies, Vintage, 1950). online 
 The Diplomacy of Imperialism, 1890–1902  (1935) (two volumes) online review ; online copy 
 Our Vichy Gamble  (1947)
 The Challenge to Isolation, 1937–1940  (1952) with S. Everett Gleason online
 The Undeclared War, 1940–1941  (1953) with S. Everett Gleason
Conyers Read, 1881–1959: Scholar, Teacher, Public Servant (M. and V. Dean, 1963)
 Political and Social Upheaval, 1832–1852  (1969) online 
 In and out of the ivory tower (1977), autobiography  online

References

Sources
In and Out of the Ivory Tower: The Autobiography of William L. Langer (Neele Watson Academic Publications, 1977) 

1896 births
1977 deaths
20th-century American historians
20th-century American male writers
American Unitarians
United States Army personnel of World War I
Clark University alumni
Clark University faculty
American people of German descent
Harvard University alumni
Harvard University faculty
Writers from Boston
Presidents of the American Historical Association

People of the Office of Strategic Services
Historians of American foreign relations
People of the Central Intelligence Agency
The Fletcher School at Tufts University faculty
University of Chicago faculty
Yale University faculty
Columbia University faculty
Medal for Merit recipients
Members of the American Philosophical Society
Boston Latin School alumni
Historians from Massachusetts
Harvard Extension School faculty
Bancroft Prize winners
American male non-fiction writers